Mahmood Merza Mahdi Ahmed Al Ajmi (born 8 May 1987) is a Bahraini professional football player who last played for Al-Safa. He also represented the Bahrain national team from 2007 to 2013.

Club career

Al-Shabab
Al-Ajmi began his professional club career with Al-Shabab Manama in 2006 and appeared in 44 league matches, scoring 11 goals until his move to Bahrain Riffa in 2009.

Al-Riffa
In 2010, he signed with Al-Riffa and scored 22 goals in 33 league matches till 2011. He was also in Riffa's Bahraini King's Cup winning squad in 2010. With Riffa, he played in the 2010 AFC Cup continental tournament where Riffa emerged as semi-finalist.

KF Tirana
He was presented to the media on 12 July 2011 along with the other new signings by the club president Refik Halili, where KF Tirana's new kit was unveiled with Al Ajmi chosen to wear the number 10 shirt.

With Tirana between 2011 and 2012, he lifted tournaments like 2010–11 Albanian Cup and 2011 Albanian Supercup.

Manama Club
After his stint with Tirana in Albania, he returned to Bahraini Premier League with Manama and appeared in 55 league and cup matches, scoring 12 goals.

Hidd SCC
In the 2012–2013 season, he appeared with Hidd SCC in 22 matches in the Premier League before his second stint with Al-Shabab.

Al Safa
In 2014, he moved to Saudi Arabia and joined Saudi Second Division side Al Safa FC.

Back to Manama
Al-Ajmi came back with his previous side Manama Club in 2015. It was his one of the most successful stints in his club career, appearing in 88 league matches and scoring 29 goals. With Manama, he won the prestigious 2016–17 Bahraini King's Cup and 2017 Bahraini Super Cup.

He also represented the club in the 2018 AFC Cup, but Manama didn't qualify for the knockout stages as they lost 5 matches in the Group-B.

Gokulam Kerala
In 2018, he moved to India and joined I-League side Gokulam Kerala FC. He scored his first goal for the Malabarians, against Mohun Bagan AC on 12 February. He appeared in 10 league matches, scoring 3 goals.

With Gokulam, He has also appeared in the Hero Super Cup in 2018.

International career
Al-Ajmi made his senior international debut on 16 October 2007 against Libya in a 2–0 win match. He scored his first goal for Bahrain against Iran in a 2014 FIFA World Cup Qualification match, which ended as 1-1.

He has also represented Bahrain in tournaments including 2010 WAFF Championship, 2012 Arab Nations Cup alongside 2015 AFC Asian Cup Qualification. He appeared in a total of 12 matches for the Bahrain and scored 3 goals between 2007 and 2013.

Pepsi Tournament
Al Ajmi's exploits include the Channel 4 2006 TV series The Pepsi Max World Challenge. In November 2005, Pepsi and T4 teamed up to find the best 2 amateur footballers in Bahrain, with AlAjmi and Mohamed Ajaj beating thousands of entries. They went on to compete against the best amateur players from 10 other countries. The series was set around the globe with a $100,000 prize for the winning team performing different football challenges involving David Beckham, Ronaldinho, Thierry Henry and Alessandro Nesta. The two Bahraini footballers got the highest points throughout the tournament to lose in the final.

Career statistics

International goals
Scores and results list Bahrain's goal tally first.

Honours
Al-Riffa
Bahraini King's Cup: 2010
KF Tirana
Albanian Cup: 2010–11
Albanian Supercup: 2011
Manama Club
Bahraini King's Cup: 2016–17
Bahraini Super Cup: 2017

See also
 Bahrain international footballers

References

External links
 
 

1987 births
Living people
KF Tirana players
Expatriate footballers in Albania
Expatriate footballers in Saudi Arabia
Expatriate footballers in India
Kategoria Superiore players
Saudi First Division League players
Saudi Second Division players
2011 AFC Asian Cup players
Bahraini footballers
Al Safa FC players
Bahraini people of Iranian descent
Association football midfielders
Bahrain international footballers
I-League players